Angels! is a themed anthology of fantasy short works edited by Jack Dann and Gardner Dozois. It was first published in paperback by Ace Books in June 1995. It was reissued as an ebook by Baen Books in June 2013.

The book collects fourteen novelettes, short stories and poems by various authors.

Contents
"Basileus" (Robert Silverberg)
"Angelica" (Jane Yolen)
"Angels" (Bruce McAllister)
"If Angels Ate Apples" (poem) (Geoffrey A. Landis)
"Alfred" (Lisa Goldstein)
"A Plethora of Angels" (Robert Sampson)
"The Man Who Loved the Faioli" (Roger Zelazny)
"Upon the Dull Earth" (Philip K. Dick)
"Angel" (Pat Cadigan)
"Curse of the Angel's Wife" (poem) (Bruce Boston)
"Sleepers Awake" (Jamil Nasir)
"And the Angels Sing" (Kate Wilhelm)
"Grave Angels" (Richard Kearns)
"All Vows" (Esther M. Friesner)

References

1995 anthologies
Fantasy anthologies
Jack Dann and Gardner Dozois Ace anthologies
Ace Books books
Books about angels